Bryce House or Bryce Building may refer to:

Bryce Building (Fort Worth, Texas), listed on the NRHP in Texas 
William J. Bryce House, Fort Worth, Texas, listed on the NRHP in Texas
Bryce Inn, Bryce Canyon, Utah, listed on the NRHP in Utah

See also
Brice House (disambiguation)
Bryce Building (Fort Worth, Texas), listed on the NRHP in Texas